Arthur Francis Nichols  (born Arthur Francis Meikle) (July 14, 1871 – August 9, 1945) was a catcher, first baseman, and outfielder in Major League Baseball.

Nichols primarily played as a backup. Offensively, his best batting average year was in 1898, his rookie season, with the Chicago Orphans where he batted .286 with a slugging percentage of .310, although he did only play in 14 games, all at catcher. The following year his average dropped to .255 but his slugging improved to .362. He played in 17 games that year (15 at catcher, two as a Pinch hitter). In 1900, still with the Orphans, he played in eight games as catcher, batting .200 and slugging .200. Not much is known as to whether he was traded to the St.Louis or if he signed because of free agency (which is very unlikely due to the Reserve clause), but once there he saw much more game play. Once in St. Louis he saw more play at other positions besides catcher.

In his first season for St. Louis (1901), he made 93 appearances during the season, 47 at catcher, 40 playing in the outfield, and six as a pinch hitter. His offensive numbers improve from the year prior, batting .244 and slugging .308. He drove in a career high 33 RBIs. He was also hit ten times by pitch, which was fifth most in the league that year. Most of his appearances in 1902 were at first base. He played 56 games at first, 11 at catcher, and four in the outfield. He also made two appearances as a pinch hitter. His offensive numbers again improved, batting .267 and slugging .327. although his RBIs dropped from 33 to 31. In 1903, his use defensively dropped. He played 34 games defensively, 25 at first, two at catcher, and seven in the outfield. He also made two appearances as a pinch hitter. He batted a career low .192. His slugging percentage was .208, only eight points over his career low of .200 in 1900.

Nichols spent the majority of his career in the minors. Defensively in the minors he played not only catcher, first base, and the outfield, but he also played 13 career games at shortstop, 22 at third base, and 27 at second base. Nichols retired from baseball at the age of 41.

Considering he played during the dead-ball era his offensive numbers were respectable.  He also had 51 stolen bases in his career, with his best year coming in 1902 when he stole 18. He ended his career in MLB with 194 hits, (28 doubles, 3 triples, and 3 home runs). He made 44 errors in his career for an overall fielding percentage of .970. He is one of the one hundred players to play at Wahconah Park with previous major league experience, playing there in 1913 with the Pittsfield Electrics of the now defunct Connecticut League. He died on August 9, 1945, at the age of 74.

Sources

1871 births
1945 deaths
Chicago Orphans players
St. Louis Cardinals players
19th-century baseball players
Major League Baseball catchers
Major League Baseball first basemen
Major League Baseball outfielders
Baseball players from New Hampshire
Bangor Millionaires players
Torrington Tornadoes players
Springfield Ponies players
Springfield Maroons players
Minneapolis Millers (baseball) players
Indianapolis Indians players
Rochester Bronchos players
Waterbury Authors players
Nashville Vols players
Waterbury Invincibles players
Waterbury Finnegans players
Waterbury Champs players
Waterbury Spuds players
Pittsfield Electrics players
Waterbury Contenders players